Noor Azhar Abdul Hamid (born 8 February 1949) is a former Singaporean high jumper. His national record of  set during the 1973 Southeast Asian Peninsular Games stood for 22 years until it was broken by Wong Yew Tong in 1995, and won him the 1974 Singapore National Olympic Council Sportsman of the Year award. In 1999, Noor Azhar was ranked 25th in a list of Singapore's 50 Greatest Athletes of the Century by The Straits Times.

Athletics career 

In 1966, the Whitley Secondary School student became the first schoolboy to clear .

However, he was not included in the Singapore contingent for the 1968 Summer Olympics as the Singapore Amateur Athletic Association (SAAA) had failed to arrange trials for him nor nominate him for selection.

He qualified for the 1970 British Commonwealth Games in Edinburgh but finished well outside the medal spots in ninth place.

In July 1971, he went for a three-month training cum competition course in West Germany. Despite exposure to the Fosbury Flop in Germany, and the increasing popularisation and adoption of the technique by other high jumpers, Noor Azhar stuck to the straddle that he would further refine while playing sepak takraw, throughout his career.

In 1972, Noor Azhar was sponsored by West Germany for the 1972 Summer Olympics in Munich, including a three-month pre-Olympic training and competition stint in Cologne, without the need to undergo qualifying trials. He cleared  to place him a joint-33rd in the high jump.

The achievement won him the 1974 Singapore National Olympic Council Sportsman of the Year.

Noor Azhar was Singapore's flag-bearer at the 1974 British Commonwealth Games in Christchurch. Despite achieving 2.14 m in practice, nerves got the better of him and he could only manage  to finish sixth at the Games.

He withdrew from the 1977 Southeast Asian Games as work commitments were affecting his training. He returned to competitive action in the 1978 Singapore Open, clearing  for third place. With his decline, he was not selected for the 1978 Asian Games.

In 1983, Noor Azhar finished fifth in the Southeast Asian Games held in Singapore as his decade-old game record was broken by Malaysia's Ramjit Nairu, who improved on the old mark by 0.01 cm.

References

External links
 
 
 
 

1949 births
Living people
Singaporean people of Malay descent
Singaporean male high jumpers
Athletes (track and field) at the 1970 British Commonwealth Games
Athletes (track and field) at the 1970 Asian Games
Athletes (track and field) at the 1972 Summer Olympics
Athletes (track and field) at the 1974 British Commonwealth Games
Athletes (track and field) at the 1974 Asian Games
Commonwealth Games competitors for Singapore
Olympic athletes of Singapore
Asian Games competitors for Singapore
Southeast Asian Games medalists in athletics
Southeast Asian Games gold medalists for Singapore
Competitors at the 1973 Southeast Asian Peninsular Games